Four ships named Bridgewater sailed as East Indiamen for the British East India Company (EIC):

 was launched in 1719, made four voyages for the EIC, and was sold in 1731.
 was launched in 1769, made four voyages for the EIC, and was sold in 1782 for breaking up. On 8 March 1779 as she was sailing from Saint Helena back to England, she encountered and repelled an attack by the New Hampshire privateer Hampden.
 was launched in 1785, made six complete voyages as a regular ship for the EIC and one as an extra ship; she was lost at sea in 1805 during her eighth voyage.
 was launched in 1812, made eight complete voyages as a regular ship for the EIC, and was condemned at Calcutta in 1831 on her ninth after she was dismasted in a hurricane.

Ship names